Nove Mesto, meaning "New Town" in Czech and Slovak, may refer to:

 Nové Město (disambiguation), places in the Czech Republic
 Nové Mesto (disambiguation), places in Slovakia and Hungary